Several theorems are associated with the name of Georg Cantor:

Set theory 
 Cantor's theorem: the cardinality of a power set of a set A is strictly greater than the cardinality of A
 Cantor–Bernstein theorem: cardinality of the class of countable order types equals the cardinality of the continuum
 Cantor–Bernstein–Schröder theorem: injections from A to B and from B to A imply a bijection between A and B

Order theory and model theory 
 Cantor's isomorphism theorem: every two countable dense unbounded linear orders are isomorphic

Topology 
 Cantor's intersection theorem: a decreasing nested sequence of non-empty compact sets has a non-empty intersection
 Heine–Cantor theorem: a continuous function on a compact space is uniformly continuous
 Cantor–Bendixson theorem: a closed set of a Polish space may be written uniquely as a disjoint union of a perfect set and a countable set

See also
Cantor's diagonal argument

Georg Cantor